"Just a Little Heartache" was the second single released by Maria Arredondo on December 9, 2002. There's no video for this single.

Track listing
Norwegian CD Single
"Just a Little Heartache" - 03:18
"Can Let Go" (Mpetre Remix) - 03:23

Charts

References

Maria Arredondo songs
2002 songs
Songs written by Espen Lind
Songs written by Amund Bjørklund